Officially the Basilica of Our Lady of the Mount Bandra, colloquially known as Mount Bandra and Mount St Mary Church, is a basilica (shrine) of the Latin Church in India, located in the Bandra neighbourhood of Bombay (Mumbai).

The festival of the nativity of St Mary, also known as Marymas or the Bandra Fest, is celebrated here on the 8th day of September, which is the occasion of the birth of the virgin-mother of Jesus Christ. The annual feast is followed by a week-long fair or fete known in the Konkan region as the "Bandra fair", which is visited by thousands of tourists, pilgrims& devotees every year.

Pope Pius XII granted a decree of canonical coronation to its venerated Marian icon on 21 October 1954, both signed and notarised by Cardinal Giovanni Battista Montini of the Sacred Congregation of Rites. The image of the Virgin and Child was then crowned on 5 December 1954 by Cardinal Valerian Gracias.

The Basilica
The basilica stands on a hillock, about 80 metres above sea level overlooking the Arabian Sea. It draws lakhs of devotees and pilgrims annually. Many of the faithful attest to the miraculous powers of the Blessed Virgin Mary. The shrine attracts people from all faiths who pray to the Virgin Mary for expressing their gratitude or requesting favours. The church was raided and destroyed in 1738 during the Mahratta Invasion of Bassein, led by the Peshva Brahmin Chimaji Appa. It was rebuilt in British Bombay.

During the Bandra Fair, the entire area is decorated with festoons and buntings. Many pitch up stalls to sell religious articles, roasted grams, snacks and sweets. Wax figures of the Virgin Mary along with an assortment of candles shaped like hands, feet and various other parts of the body are sold at kiosks. The sick and the suffering choose a candle or wax figure that corresponds to their ailment and light it in Church, with the pious hope that Mother Mary will consider their appeals for help.

The statue of the Virgin Mary

Although the current structure and edifice of the shrine is just 100 years old and was rebuilt in British Bombay; the history behind the current statue of the Blessed Mary, goes back to the 16th century when Jesuit priests brought the statue and constructed a chapel in what was then, the Portuguese East Indies. In 1700, Sunni Arab pirates raiding the area were interested in the gilt-lined object held in the hand, they desecrated the statue by cutting off the right hand.

In 1760, the church was rebuilt after Mahratta invasion of Goa and Bombay, and the statue was substituted with a statue of Our Lady of Navigators in the St Andrew's Church nearby. Legend has it that a Koli Christian fisherman dreamt of the statue floating in the sea, and as prophesied in the dream the statue was indeed found the next day, floating in the sea. A Jesuit Annual Letter dated to 1669 and published in the book St Andrew's Church, Bandra (1616–1966) supports this claim. The Koli Fishermen call the statue as Mot Mauli, literally meaning the Pearl Mother or the Mother of the Mount, Mot could be a corruption of the Indo-Portuguese word monte for "mount"; Maoli is a Marathi-Konkani word for "mother". However, the previous statue is now restored, is enshrined in a place of honour in the basilica.  Both Hindu and Koli Christians (Bombay East Indians) visit this shrine often making the place a prominent feature of intercommunal harmony and interfaith dialogue in Bombay.

See also
Mother goddess#Christianity
Weeping Crucifix in Bombay
Bandra Fest

References

External links

Official Web Site 

Our Lady of the Mount, Bandra
Roman Catholic churches in Mumbai
Bandra
Mumbai
History of Mumbai